The Men's 3 m synchro springboard competition of the 2014 European Aquatics Championships was held on 22 August.

Results
The preliminary round was held at 12:00 and the final at 16:00.

Green denotes finalists

References

2014 European Aquatics Championships